Phosphate minerals contain the tetrahedrally coordinated phosphate (PO43−) anion, sometimes with arsenate (AsO43−) and vanadate (VO43−) substitutions, along with chloride (Cl−), fluoride (F−), and hydroxide (OH−) anions, that also fit into the crystal structure.

The phosphate class of minerals is a large and diverse group, however, only a few species are relatively common.

Applications

Phosphate rock has high concentration of phosphate minerals, most commonly from the apatite group of minerals. It is the major resource mined to produce phosphate fertilizers for the agricultural industry. Phosphate is also used in animal feed supplements, food preservatives, anti-corrosion agents, cosmetics, fungicides, ceramics, water treatment and metallurgy.

The production of fertilizer is the largest source responsible for minerals mined for their phosphate content.

Phosphate minerals are often used to control rust, and to prevent corrosion on ferrous materials applied with electrochemical conversion coatings.

Examples 
Phosphate minerals include:
Triphylite Li(Fe,Mn)PO4
Monazite (La, Y, Nd, Sm, Gd, Ce,Th)PO4, rare earth metals
Hinsdalite PbAl3(PO4)(SO4)(OH)6
Pyromorphite Pb5(PO4)3Cl
Erythrite Co3(AsO4)2·8H2O
Amblygonite LiAlPO4F
Lazulite (Mg,Fe)Al2(PO4)2(OH)2
Wavellite Al3(PO4)2(OH)3·5H2O
Turquoise CuAl6(PO4)4(OH)8·5H2O
Autunite Ca(UO2)2(PO4)2·10-12H2O
Phosphophyllite Zn2(Fe,Mn)(PO4)2•4H2O
Struvite (NH4)MgPO4·6H2O
Xenotime-Y Y(PO4)
Apatite group Ca5(PO4)3(F,Cl,OH)
Hydroxylapatite Ca5(PO4)3OH
Fluorapatite Ca5(PO4)3F
Chlorapatite Ca5(PO4)3Cl
Bromapatite
Mitridatite group:
Arseniosiderite-mitridatite series (Ca2(Fe3+)3[(O)2|(AsO4)3]·3H2O -- Ca2(Fe3+)3[(O)2|(PO4)3]·3H2O)
Arseniosiderite-robertsite series (Ca2(Fe3+)3[(O)2|(AsO4)3]·3H2O -- Ca3(Mn3+)4[(OH)3|(PO4)2]2·3H2O)

Nickel–Strunz classification -08- phosphates 
IMA-CNMNC proposes a new hierarchical scheme (Mills et al., 2009). This list uses it to modify the classification of Nickel–Strunz (mindat.org, 10 ed, pending publication).

Abbreviations:
"*" – discredited (IMA/CNMNC status).
"?" – questionable/doubtful (IMA/CNMNC status).
"REE" – Rare-earth element (Sc, Y, La, Ce, Pr, Nd, Pm, Sm, Eu, Gd, Tb, Dy, Ho, Er, Tm, Yb, Lu)
"PGE" – Platinum-group element (Ru, Rh, Pd, Os, Ir, Pt)
03.C Aluminofluorides, 06 Borates, 08 Vanadates (04.H V[5,6] Vanadates), 09 Silicates:
Neso: insular (from Greek νησος nēsos, island)
Soro: grouping (from Greek σωροῦ sōros, heap, mound (especially of corn))
Cyclo: ring
Ino: chain (from Greek ις [genitive: ινος inos], fibre)  
Phyllo: sheet (from Greek φύλλον phyllon, leaf) 
Tekto: three-dimensional framework
Nickel–Strunz code scheme: NN.XY.##x
NN: Nickel–Strunz mineral class number
X: Nickel–Strunz mineral division letter
Y: Nickel–Strunz mineral family letter
##x: Nickel–Strunz mineral/group number, x add-on letter

Class: phosphates 
 08.A Phosphates, etc. without additional anions, without H2O
 08.AA With small cations (some also with larger ones): 05 Berlinite, 05 Rodolicoite; 10 Beryllonite, 15 Hurlbutite, 20 Lithiophosphate, 25 Nalipoite, 30 Olympite
 08.AB With medium-sized cations: 05 Farringtonite; 10 Ferrisicklerite, 10 Heterosite, 10 Natrophilite, 10 Lithiophilite, 10 Purpurite, 10 Sicklerite, 10 Simferite, 10 Triphylite; 15 Chopinite, 15 Sarcopside; 20 Beusite, 20 Graftonite
 08.AC With medium-sized and large cations: 10 IMA2008-054, 10 Alluaudite, 10 Hagendorfite, 10 Ferroalluaudite, 10 Maghagendorfite, 10 Varulite, 10 Ferrohagendorfite*; 15 Bobfergusonite, 15 Ferrowyllieite, 15 Qingheiite, 15 Rosemaryite, 15 Wyllieite, 15 Ferrorosemaryite; 20 Maricite, 30 Brianite, 35 Vitusite-(Ce); 40 Olgite?, 40 Bario-olgite; 45 Ferromerrillite, 45 Bobdownsite, 45 Merrillite-(Ca)*, 45 Merrillite, 45 Merrillite-(Y)*, 45 Whitlockite, 45 Tuite, 45 Strontiowhitlockite; 50 Stornesite-(Y), 50 Xenophyllite, 50 Fillowite, 50 Chladniite, 50 Johnsomervilleite, 50 Galileiite; 55 Harrisonite, 60 Kosnarite, 65 Panethite, 70 Stanfieldite, 90 IMA2008-064
 08.AD With only large cations: 05 Nahpoite, 10 Monetite, 15 Archerite, 15 Biphosphammite; 20 Phosphammite, 25 Buchwaldite; 35 Pretulite, 35 Xenotime-(Y), 35 Xenotime-(Yb); 45 Ximengite, 50 Monazite-(Ce), 50 Monazite-(La), 50 Monazite-(Nd), 50 Monazite-(Sm), 50 Brabantite?
 08.B Phosphates, etc. with Additional Anions, without H2O
 08.BA With small and medium-sized cations: 05 Vayrynenite; 10 Hydroxylherderite, 10 Herderite; 15 Babefphite
 08.BB With only medium-sized cations, (OH, etc.):RO4 £1:1: 05 Amblygonite, 05 Natromontebrasite?, 05 Montebrasite?, 05 Tavorite; 10 Zwieselite, 10 Triplite, 10 Magniotriplite?, 10 Hydroxylwagnerite; 15 Joosteite, 15 Stanekite, 15 Triploidite, 15 Wolfeite, 15 Wagnerite; 20 Satterlyite, 20 Holtedahlite; 25 Althausite; 30 Libethenite, 30 Zincolibethenite; 35 Tarbuttite; 40 Barbosalite, 40 Hentschelite, 40 Scorzalite, 40 Lazulite; 45 Trolleite, 55 Phosphoellenbergerite; 90 Zinclipscombite, 90 Lipscombite, 90 Richellite
 08.BC With only medium-sized cations, (OH, etc.):RO4 > 1:1 and < 2:1: 10 Plimerite, 10 Frondelite, 10 Rockbridgeite
 08.BD With only medium-sized cations, (OH, etc.):RO4 = 2:1: 05 Pseudomalachite, 05 Reichenbachite, 10 Gatehouseite, 25 Ludjibaite
 08.BE With only medium-sized cations, (OH, etc.):RO4 > 2:1: 05 Augelite, 10 Grattarolaite, 15 Cornetite, 30 Raadeite, 85 Waterhouseite 
 08.BF With medium-sized and large cations, (OH, etc.):RO4 < 0.5:1: 05 Arrojadite, 05 Arrojadite-(BaFe), 05 Arrojadite-(KFe), 05 Arrojadite-(NaFe), 05 Arrojadite-(SrFe), 05 Arrojadite-(KNa), 05 Arrojadite-(PbFe), 05 Arrojadite-(BaNa), 05 Fluorarrojadite-(BaNa), 05 Fluorarrojadite-(KNa), 05 Fluorarrojadite-(BaFe), 05 Ferri-arrojadite-(BaNa), 05 Dickinsonite, 05 Dickinsonite-(KNa), 05 Dickinsonite-(KMnNa), 05 Dickinsonite-(KNaNa), 05 Dickinsonite-(NaNa); 10 Samuelsonite, 15 Griphite, 20 Nabiasite
 08.BG With medium-sized and large cations, (OH, etc.):RO4 = 0.5:1: 05 Bearthite, 05 Goedkenite, 05 Tsumebite; 10 Melonjosephite, 15 Tancoite
 08.BH With medium-sized and large cations, (OH,etc.):RO4 = 1:1: 05 Thadeuite; 10 Lacroixite, 10 Isokite, 10 Panasqueiraite; 15 Drugmanite; 20 Bjarebyite, 20 Kulanite, 20 Penikisite, 20 Perloffite, 20 Johntomaite; 25 Bertossaite, 25 Palermoite; 55 Jagowerite, 60 Attakolite
 08.BK With medium-sized and large cations, (OH, etc.): 05 Brazilianite, 15 Curetonite, 25 Lulzacite
 08.BL With medium-sized and large cations, (OH, etc.):RO4 = 3:1: 05 Corkite, 05 Hinsdalite, 05 Orpheite, 05 Woodhouseite, 05 Svanbergite; 10 Kintoreite, 10 Benauite, 10 Crandallite, 10 Goyazite, 10 Springcreekite, 10 Gorceixite; 10 Lusungite?, 10 Plumbogummite, 10 Ferrazite?; 13 Eylettersite, 13 Florencite-(Ce), 13 Florencite-(La), 13 Florencite-(Nd), 13 Waylandite, 13 Zairite; 15 Viitaniemiite, 20 Kuksite, 25 Pattersonite
 08.BM With medium-sized and large cations, (OH, etc.):RO4 = 4:1: 10 Paulkellerite, 15 Brendelite
 08.BN With only large cations, (OH, etc.):RO4 = 0.33:1: 05 IMA2008-068, 05 Phosphohedyphane, 05 IMA2008-009, 05 Alforsite, 05 Apatite*, 05 Apatite-(CaOH), 05 Apatite-(CaCl), 05 Apatite-(CaF), 05 Apatite-(SrOH), 05 Apatite-(CaOH)-M, Carbonate-fluorapatite?, 05 Carbonate-hydroxylapatite?, 05 Belovite-(Ce), 05 Belovite-(La), 05 Fluorcaphite, 05 Pyromorphite, 05 Hydroxylpyromorphite, 05 Deloneite-(Ce), 05 Kuannersuite-(Ce), 10 Arctite
 08.BO With only large cations, (OH, etc.):RO4 1:1: 05 Nacaphite, 10 Petitjeanite, 15 Smrkovecite, 25 Heneuite, 30 Nefedovite, 40 Artsmithite
 08.C Phosphates without Additional Anions, with H2O
 08.CA With small and large/medium cations: 05 Fransoletite, 05 Parafransoletite; 10 Ehrleite, 15 Faheyite; 20 Gainesite, 20 Mccrillisite, 20 Selwynite; 25 Pahasapaite, 30 Hopeite, 40 Phosphophyllite; 45 Parascholzite, 45 Scholzite; 65 Gengenbachite, 70 Parahopeite
 08.CB With only medium-sized cations, RO4:H2O = 1:1: 05 Serrabrancaite, 10 Hureaulite
 08.CC With only medium-sized cations, RO4:H2O = 1:1.5: 05 Garyansellite, 05 Kryzhanovskite, 05 Landesite, 05 Phosphoferrite, 05 Reddingite
 08.CD With only medium-sized cations, RO4:H2O = 1:2: 05 Kolbeckite, 05 Metavariscite, 05 Phosphosiderite; 10 Strengite, 10 Variscite; 20 Ludlamite
 08.CE With only medium-sized cations, RO4:H2O £1:2.5: 10 Newberyite, 20 Phosphorrosslerite; 25 Metaswitzerite, 25 Switzerite; 35 Bobierrite; 40 Arupite, 40 Baricite, 40 Vivianite, 40 Pakhomovskyite; 50 Cattiite, 55 Koninckite; 75 IMA2008-046, 75 Malhmoodite; 80 Santabarbaraite, 85 Metavivianite
 08.CF With large and medium-sized cations, RO4:H2O > 1:1: 05 Tassieite, 05 Wicksite, 05 Bederite; 10 Haigerachite
 08.CG With large and medium-sized cations, RO4:H2O = 1:1: 05 Collinsite, 05 Cassidyite, 05 Fairfieldite, 05 Messelite, 05 Hillite, (05 Uranophane-beta but Uranophane 09.AK.15); 20 Phosphogartrellite
 08.CH With large and medium-sized cations, RO4:H2O < 1:1: 10 Anapaite, 20 Dittmarite, 20 Niahite, 25 Francoanellite, 25 Taranakite, 30 Schertelite, 35 Hannayite, 40 Hazenite, 40 Struvite, 40 Struvite-(K), 45 Rimkorolgite, 50 Bakhchisaraitsevite, 55 IMA2008-048
 08.CJ With only large cations: 05 Stercorite, 10 Mundrabillaite, 10 Swaknoite, 15 Nastrophite, 15 Nabaphite, 45 Brockite, 45 Grayite, 45 Rhabdophane-(Ce), 45 Rhabdophane-(La), 45 Rhabdophane-(Nd), 45 Tristramite, 50 Brushite, 50 Churchite-(Dy)*, 50 Churchite-(Nd), 50 Churchite-(Y), 50 Ardealite, 60 Dorfmanite, 70 Catalanoite, 80 Ningyoite
 08.D Phosphates
 08.DA With small (and occasionally larger) cations: 05 Moraesite, 10 Footemineite, 10 Ruifrancoite, 10 Guimaraesite, 10 Roscherite, 10 Zanazziite, 10 Atencioite, 10 Greifensteinite; 15 Uralolite, 20 Weinebeneite, 25 Tiptopite, 30 Veszelyite, 35 Kipushite, 40 Spencerite, 45 Glucine
 08.DB With only medium-sized cations, (OH, etc.):RO4 < 1:1: 05 Diadochite, 10 Vashegyite, 15 Schoonerite, 20 Sinkankasite, 25 Mitryaevaite, 30 Sanjuanite, 50 Giniite, 55 Sasaite, 60 Mcauslanite, 65 Goldquarryite, 70 Birchite
 08.DC With only medium-sized cations, (OH, etc.):RO4 = 1:1 and < 2:1: 05 Nissonite; 15 Kunatite, 15 Earlshannonite, 15 Whitmoreite; 17 Kleemanite, 20 Bermanite, 207? Oxiberaunite*, 22 Kovdorskite; 25 Ferrostrunzite, 25 Ferristrunzite, 25 Metavauxite, 25 Strunzite; 27 Beraunite; 30 Gordonite, 30 Laueite, 30 Sigloite, 30 Paravauxite, 30 Ushkovite, 30 Ferrolaueite, 30 Mangangordonite, 30 Pseudolaueite, 30 Stewartite, 30 Kastningite, 35 Vauxite, 37 Vantasselite, 40 Cacoxenite; 45 Gormanite, 45 Souzalite; 47 Kingite; 50 Wavellite, 50 Allanpringite, 52 Kribergite, 60 Nevadaite
 08.DD With only medium-sized cations, (OH, etc.):RO4 = 2:1: 15 Aheylite, 15 Chalcosiderite, 15 Faustite, 15 Planerite, 15 Turquoise; 20 Ernstite, 20 Childrenite, 20 Eosphorite
 08.DE With only medium-sized cations, (OH, etc.):RO4 = 3:1: 05 Senegalite, 10 Fluellite, 20 Zapatalite, (35 Alumoakermanite, Mindat.org: 09.BB.10), 35 Aldermanite
 08.DF With only medium-sized cations, (OH,etc.):RO4 > 3:1: 05 Hotsonite-VII, 05 Hotsonite-VI; 10 Bolivarite, 10 Evansite, 10 Rosieresite, 25 Sieleckiite, 40 Gladiusite
 08.DG With large and medium-sized cations, (OH, etc.):RO4 < 0.5:1: 05 Sampleite
 08.DH With large and medium-sized cations, (OH, etc.):RO4 < 1:1: 05 Minyulite; 10 Leucophosphite, 10 Spheniscidite, 10 Tinsleyite; 15 Kaluginite*, 15 Keckite, 15 Jahnsite-(CaMnFe), 15 Jahnsite-(CaMnMg), 15 Jahnsite-(CaMnMn), 15 Jahnsite-(MnMnMn)*, 15 Jahnsite-(CaFeFe), 15 Jahnsite-(NaFeMg), 15 Jahnsite-(CaMgMg), 15 Jahnsite-(NaMnMg), 15 Rittmannite, 15 Whiteite-(MnFeMg), 15 Whiteite-(CaFeMg), 15 Whiteite-(CaMnMg); 20 Manganosegelerite, 20 Overite, 20 Segelerite, 20 Wilhelmvierlingite, 20 Juonniite; 25 Calcioferrite, 25 Kingsmountite, 25 Montgomeryite, 25 Zodacite; 30 Lunokite, 30 Pararobertsite, 30 Robertsite, 30 Mitridatite; 35 Matveevite?, 35 Mantienneite, 35 Paulkerrite, 35 Benyacarite, 40 Xanthoxenite, 55 Englishite
 08.DJ With large and medium-sized cations, (OH, etc.):RO4 = 1:l: 05 Johnwalkite, 05 Olmsteadite, 10 Gatumbaite, 20 Meurigite-Na, 20 Meurigite-K, 20 Phosphofibrite, 25 Jungite, 30 Wycheproofite, 35 Ercitite, 40 Mrazekite
 08.DK With large and medium-sized cations, (OH, etc.):RO4 > 1:1 and < 2:1: 15 Matioliite, 15 IMA2008-056, 15 Dufrenite, 15 Burangaite, 15 Natrodufrenite; 20 Kidwellite, 25 Bleasdaleite, 30 Matulaite, 35 Krasnovite
 08.DL With large and medium-sized cations, (OH, etc.):RO4 = 2:1: 05 Foggite; 10 Cyrilovite, 10 Millisite, 10 Wardite; 15 Petersite-(Y), 15 Calciopetersite; 25 Angastonite
 08.DM With large and medium-sized cations, (OH, etc.):RO4 > 2:1: 05 Morinite, 15 Melkovite, 25 Gutsevichite?, 35 Delvauxite
 08.DN With only large cations: 05 Natrophosphate, 10 Isoclasite, 15 Lermontovite, 20 Vyacheslavite
 08.DO With CO3, SO4, SiO4: 05 Girvasite, 10 Voggite, 15 Peisleyite, 20 Perhamite, 25 Saryarkite-(Y), 30 Micheelsenite, 40 Parwanite, 45 Skorpionite
 08.E Uranyl Phosphates
 08.EA UO2:RO4 = 1:2: 05 Phosphowalpurgite, 10 Parsonsite, 15 Ulrichite, 20 Lakebogaite
 08.EB UO2:RO4 = 1:1: 05 Autunite, 05 Uranocircite, 05 Torbernite, 05 Xiangjiangite, 05 Saleeite; 10 Bassetite, 10 Meta-autunite, 10 Metauranocircite, 10 Metatorbernite, 10 Lehnerite, 10 Przhevalskite; 15 Chernikovite, 15 Meta-ankoleite, 15 Uramphite; 20 Threadgoldite, 25 Uranospathite, 30 Vochtenite, 35 Coconinoite, 40 Ranunculite, 45 Triangulite, 50 Furongite, 55 Sabugalite
 08.EC UO2:RO4 = 3:2: 05 Francoisite-(Ce), 05 Francoisite-(Nd), 05 Phuralumite, 05 Upalite; 10 Kivuite?, 10 Yingjiangite, 10 Renardite, 10 Dewindtite, 10 Phosphuranylite; 15 Dumontite; 20 Metavanmeersscheite, 20 Vanmeersscheite; 25 Althupite, 30 Mundite, 35 Phurcalite, 40 Bergenite
 08.ED Unclassified: 05 Moreauite, 10 Sreinite, 15 Kamitugaite
 08.F Polyphosphates
 08.FA Polyphosphates, without OH and H2O; dimers of corner-sharing RO4 tetrahedra: 20 Pyrocoproite*, 20 Pyrophosphite*
 08.FC Polyphosphates, with H2O only: 10 Canaphite, 20 Arnhemite*, 25 Wooldridgeite, 30 Kanonerovite
 08.X Unclassified Strunz Phosphates
 08.XX Unknown: 00 Sodium-autunite, 00 Pseudo-autunite*, 00 Cheralite-(Ce)?, 00 Laubmannite?, 00 Spodiosite?, 00 Sodium meta-autunite, 00 Kerstenite?, 00 Lewisite, 00 Coeruleolactite, 00 Viseite, 00 IMA2009-005

References

 Hurlbut, Cornelius S.; Klein, Cornelis, 1985, Manual of Mineralogy, 20th ed., John Wiley and Sons, New York 
 
 
 
 Webmineral - Dana
 - Australian Mineral Atlas